Adelpherupa terreus is a species of moth of the family Crambidae. It is found in Madagascar.

References

Moths described in 1877
Schoenobiinae
Moths of Madagascar